Brian Patrick Cushing (born January 24, 1987) is a former American football linebacker. He played college football at USC, and was drafted by the Houston Texans in the first round of the 2009 NFL Draft and played his entire 9-year career for the Texans from 2009 to 2017 and became the team's all-time leading tackler.

Early years
Cushing trained throughout his childhood in Park Ridge, New Jersey. He attended Bergen Catholic High School in Oradell, New Jersey and went on to lead the Crusaders to the 2004 Group IV State Championship as a linebacker, tight end, and running back against Don Bosco Preparatory High School, providing huge plays in the 13–10 win. He was named "2004 North Jersey Player of the Year" by The Record, and played in the 2005 U.S. Army All-American Bowl alongside future USC teammates Patrick Turner, Rey Maualuga, and Mark Sanchez.

Cushing was recruited by top colleges, including Notre Dame, Georgia, and Penn State before eventually committing to the University of Southern California.

College career

Cushing attended the University of Southern California and played for the USC Trojans football team from 2005 to 2008 under head coach Pete Carroll. Cushing shared the No. 10 jersey with Trojans starting quarterback John David Booty from 2005 to 2007.

Cushing was on Phil Steele's 2007 pre-season All-America team and on the 2007 Bednarik Award and Lott Trophy watch lists.

Cushing returned a failed onside kick attempted by Notre Dame at the Los Angeles Memorial Coliseum for a late fourth-quarter touchdown on November 25, 2006.

On January 1, 2007, Cushing was named the Defensive MVP of the Rose Bowl Game, after recording 2½ sacks and forcing a third-quarter fumble that changed the momentum of the game.

Cushing was named AP 2nd Team All-American as a senior despite having pedestrian statistics (73 tackles, 10½ tackles for loss, & 3 sacks). NFL scouts did not admire Cushing for his statistics, but for his versatility. Fast enough to play inside and outside linebacker and big and strong enough to play defensive end.

Cushing was one of twelve senior USC players, including the four senior linebackers Cushing, Kaluka Maiava, Clay Matthews III and Rey Maualuga, invited to the 2009 NFL Scouting Combine.  He also participated in the 2009 Senior Bowl with Maualuga, Matthews, Patrick Turner and others. Alongside fellow USC linebackers Maualuga and Matthews, he was featured on the cover of Sports Illustrated'''s 2009 NFL Draft Preview magazine, as all three were regarded as potential first-round selections.

Cushing, along with Archie Griffin of Ohio State University, are the only two players in college football history to have competed in the Rose Bowl as starters in all four seasons of their college careers.

College awards and honors
2005 Scout.com Freshman All-American
2006 All-Pac-10 Second-team
2007 All-Pac-10 Honorable Mention
2007 Rose Bowl Defensive MVP
2008 All-Pac-10 First-team selection by the conference's head coaches and Rivals.com
2008 Rivals.com First-team All-American
2008 SI.com First-team All-American
2008 Associated Press First-team All-American

Professional career

2009 season
Cushing was drafted with the 15th overall pick in the 2009 NFL Draft by the Houston Texans and had one of the best defensive seasons by a rookie in NFL history.

He scored his first career points on October 4, 2009, when he recorded a safety against the Oakland Raiders. This was the first recorded safety by a Texan since the 2002 season.

Cushing was named AFC Defensive Player of the Week for Week 6 of the 2009 NFL Season, becoming the first rookie to earn the award in the 2009 season. In Week 8, Cushing was again named AFC Defensive Player of the Week, becoming the first Texans rookie to win the award twice in one season. Cushing was also named the NFL Defensive Rookie of the Month for November 2009.

Cushing finished tied with Ray Lewis for the AFC lead with 133 tackles and added 4 sacks, 10 pass deflections, 4 interceptions, and 2 forced fumbles. He was selected to the 2010 Pro Bowl as a starter. Cushing was one of three rookies to make it to the Pro Bowl, another being a former USC teammate (Clay Matthews).
 
On January 5, 2010, Cushing was named the NFL Defensive Rookie of the Year. Cushing is the second Texan to win the award, the first being DeMeco Ryans in 2006.

2010 season

On May 7, 2010, Adam Schefter of ESPN reported that Cushing would be suspended for the first four games of the 2010 season for violating the NFL's performance-enhancing substances policy, after he tested positive in September 2009 for having above-normal levels of the human chorionic gonadotropin (hCG) hormone in his system. Cushing had previously denied rumors of having used performance-enhancing substances prior to being drafted. He then stated that he would undergo further medical tests to determine how hCG entered his system. Cushing still denies that he ever ingested or injected any performance enhancers and claimed the test result could have been from a cancerous tumor.

On May 12, 2010, in a revote of the AP Defensive Rookie of the Year award after his suspension was made public, Cushing again received the most votes, thus retaining his award. His second-team All-Pro status from his rookie season, however, was rescinded by the AP.

In the final 12 games, he totaled 76 tackles, 1½ sacks, 4 pass deflections, and 1 forced fumble.

2011 season
During training camp heading into the 2011 season, Cushing was told that he would be switching from outside to inside linebacker due to the new 3–4 defense. They believed that he would not have the speed to get to the outside, despite the fact that he had always been an outside linebacker all through high school.

In 2011, the Houston Texans finished the season with a 10–6 record and made it to the playoffs for the first time in team history. Cushing was named Team MVP and while he wasn't voted to the Pro-Bowl he earned AP 2nd Team All-Pro honors after finishing the season with 114 tackles, 4 sacks, 5 pass deflections, 2 interceptions, and 2 forced fumbles. Houston Texans defensive coordinator, Wade Phillips, called Cushing a "holy phenom" and also said that "he's one of the best I've ever coached, and I've been at it a long time." Cushing said that he will use the fact that he did not make the Pro-Bowl as "motivation and a driving force" to become better. The Texans defeated the Cincinnati Bengals 31–10 in the first round but were defeated by the Baltimore Ravens 20–13 in the Divisional Round.

2012 season
During the second quarter of the Houston Texans win over the New York Jets on Monday October 8, 2012, Cushing left the game with what appeared to be a knee injury, which was later confirmed to be a torn ACL. He was placed on injured reserve, ending his 2012 season.

2013 season
Cushing inked a six-year deal with the Houston Texans, a contract extension worth $55.6 million, which included $21 million guaranteed. Averaging $9.2 million for the next six years, the contract was the largest at the time for any inside linebacker, and made him the third highest paid inside linebacker in the NFL.

During the October 20, 2013, game against Kansas City, Cushing broke his fibula and tore his fibular collateral ligament after a low block from Chiefs running back Jamaal Charles in the third quarter. The Texans later announced that he would miss the remainder of the season.

2014 season
Cushing started the 2014 NFL season well despite being brought along slowly at the start of the season, collecting 37 tackles in the first four games as the Texans opened with an impressive 3–1 record. Cushing had 17 tackles in their loss to the New York Giants, tying the franchise record for tackles in a game.

2015 season
After being plagued by injuries in the previous two seasons, Cushing completed the 2015 season with 110 tackles. The Texans qualified for the first round of the playoffs but fell to the Kansas City Chiefs 30–0.

2016 season
During Week 1 against the Chicago Bears on September 11, 2016, Cushing suffered a partially torn MCL but he did not require surgery.

2017 season
On September 13, 2017, Cushing was suspended for ten games for again violating the NFL's policy on performance-enhancing substances.

On February 20, 2018, Cushing was released by the Texans after nine seasons as the franchise's all-time leading tackler.

NFL career statistics

 Regular season 

 Playoffs Source'':

NFL awards and honors
2× AFC Defensive Rookie of the Month (November 2009 & December 2009)
2× AFC Defensive Player of the Week (2009 weeks 6 & 8)
2009 AFC Defensive Player of the Month of November
2009 Pro Bowl selection (starter)
2009 SN-2nd Team All-Pro
2009 All-Rookie Selection (Sporting News, Pro Football Writers Association)
2009 NFL Defensive Rookie of the Year
2011 Team Captain
2011 Team MVP
2011 AP-2nd Team All-Pro
2011 NFL.com ranked 54th best player overall

Coaching career

Houston Texans
On January 29, 2019, Cushing was hired to work with strength and conditioning coaches and offer some assistance to players on defense with the Houston Texans of the National Football League (NFL).

Personal life
Cushing's mother, Antoinette, is of Polish descent; she was born in 1944 at a German forced labor camp.
 His father, Frank, was an intelligence officer in the Vietnam War. His great great uncle was American Civil War veteran Alonzo Cushing, who was killed at the Battle of Gettysburg and posthumously received the Medal of Honor. His brother, Michael Cushing, played Rugby during his time at Providence College, earning First-team All-American honors in both his junior and senior seasons.

Cushing is married to his college sweetheart Megan, an athlete who had success on USC's women's soccer squad; they began dating just prior to Cushing's NFL draft. His sister-in-law is soccer player Kealia Ohai, who is married to his former Texans teammate J. J. Watt. The Cushings have three sons together.

References

External links

 USC profile

1987 births
Living people
American Conference Pro Bowl players
American football linebackers
American sportspeople in doping cases
American people of Polish descent
Bergen Catholic High School alumni
Doping cases in American football
Houston Texans coaches
Houston Texans players
People from Park Ridge, New Jersey
Players of American football from New Jersey
Sportspeople from Bergen County, New Jersey
USC Trojans football players
Ed Block Courage Award recipients